Secret Valentine may refer to:

Secret Valentine EP, an EP by We the Kings
Secret Valentine (album), an album by Gordon Giltrap